Timothy McNutt (born June 18, 1977), better known by his stage name Johnny Richter, is a rapper from Placentia, California. He's a member of the group Kottonmouth Kings from 1996–2013; 2018–2020

Background

Kottonmouth Kings Era (1996 – 2013)
Johnny Richter was originally a member of Kottonmouth Kings, but was left off their debut album Royal Highness, because "he was serving time for marijuana possession", which Richter later said was untrue. Richter joined the group "officially" in 2000 after Saint Dog left the group.

Johnny Richter is also a member of the groups Kingspade, Subnoize Souljaz & King Klick.

Johnny Richter released his 1st solo album titled Laughing on July 6, 2010.

Independent/Solo Career (2013 – present)
In mid October 2013 via Facebook, Johnny Richter announced that he was leaving Kottonmouth Kings

In early December 2013 Johnny Richter announced that he was releasing a new solo album titled, FreeKing Out EP.  The EP was released on December 17, 2013.

In mid 2015 Johnny Richter announced that he would be releasing a new album hopefully in late 2015. In December 2015 it was announced that the album would be released on July 29, 2016. In early 2016 the track list for the album was released, and so was the name, the album is titled: School's Out (Still Laughing).
He has since returned to Kottonmouth kings and Kingspade in 2017

King Klick

King Klick EP

October 1, 2021

The King Klick was founded by Johnny Richter (formerly of the Kottonmouth Kings), Chucky Chuck DGAF, and Obnoxious. The time is right for the King Klick and we can't wait to share this new music with you. The fellas went into this project with an energy that hasn't been captured since the early Sub Noize days. The studio sessions were fueled with an incredible amount of creative energy and a whole lotta good herb. What came out of them is what many are calling the best music they have heard from Sub Noize in decades. When asked where the inspiration and creativity came from that made these songs one member simply said "the fans, this one is for the fans who rode with us during some wild times". For everyone at the Noize that was pretty dope to hear and the energy has spread from the King Klick to us and now to the worldwide Sub Noize Family. Here's to another decade of defiance!

Tracklist:

1. Throne Of Spades

2. Sub Noize O.G.'s

3. Everyday (Feat. Whitney Peyton, Hed PE, Madchild & Dropout Kings)

4. Who's Next?

5. Spaceships (Feat. Underrated and Son of Saint)

6. We Want It All (Feat. Hed PE & Madchild.

 2021 Suburban Noize Records / Regime Music Group

Discography

References

American male rappers
Rappers from California
Living people
Musicians from Orange County, California
People from Placentia, California
Suburban Noize Records artists
21st-century American rappers
21st-century American male musicians
1977 births